Ambalavilakku is a 1980 Indian Malayalam-language film,  directed by Sreekumaran Thampi and produced by S. Kumar. The film stars Madhu, Srividya, Sukumari and Jagathy Sreekumar. The film has original songs composed by V. Dakshinamoorthy.

Cast

Madhu as Gopi
Srividya as Sumathi Teacher
Sukumari as Srimathi Rama Varma
Jagathy Sreekumar as Vasukkutty
Thikkurissy Sukumaran Nair as Dr. Rama Varma
Sreelatha Namboothiri as Rajamma
Vaikkam Mani
Sivakumar
Adoor Bhavani as Gopi's Mother
Aranmula Ponnamma as Savithri's Mother-in-law
Aroor Sathyan
Kailasnath
Kuthiravattam Pappu as Lonachan
Lissy
Peyad Vijayan
Poojappura Ravi as Radhakrishnan Sir
Roopa as Geetha
Sasi
Roja Ramani as Savithri
Somasekharan Nair
Unnikrishnan Chelembra

Soundtrack
The music was composed by V. Dakshinamoorthy and the lyrics were written by Sreekumaran Thampi.

References

External links
 watch in youtube, ambalavilakku(1980)''
 

1980 films
1980s Malayalam-language films
Films directed by Sreekumaran Thampi